Mount Kenya National Park was established in 1949 to protect Mount Kenya, the wildlife and surrounding environment, which forms a habitat for wild animals, as well as acting as an area for the catchment of water, to supply Kenya's water.

History
Initially, it was a forest reserve, before being announced as a national park. Currently, the national park is encircled by the forest reserve. In April 1978, the area was designated a UNESCO Biosphere Reserve. Combined, the national park and forest reserve became a UNESCO World Heritage Site in 1997.

The Government of Kenya had four reasons for creating a national park on and around Mount Kenya. These were the importance of tourism for the local and national economies, to preserve an area of great scenic beauty, to conserve the biodiversity within the park, and to preserve the water-catchment for the surrounding area.

Area
Combined, this makes the area of the UNESCO World Heritage Site .

Volcanic sediment in the surrounding region's soil and the huge volume of fresh water coming down the slopes makes the area particularly favorable for agriculture.

Fauna
A small portion of this park's borders near heavy populations have electrified fences to keep the elephants out of the surrounding farmland. At lower altitudes, black-and-white colobus and other monkeys, and Cape buffaloes are prevalent. In 1993, a huge male lion weighing  was shot near the mountain.

See also
 East Africa
 Wildlife of Kenya

References

External links
 UNESCO Natural Site Data Sheet

Mount Kenya
National parks of Kenya
World Heritage Sites in Kenya
Biosphere reserves of Kenya
Eastern Province (Kenya)
Protected areas established in 1949